Santel is a census-designated place (CDP) in Starr County, Texas, United States. It is a new CDP formed from part of the former Los Villareales CDP prior to the 2010 census. The settlement has a population of 44 people.

Geography
Santel is located at  (26.375560, -98.883283).

Education
It is in the Rio Grande City Grulla Independent School District (formerly Rio Grande City Consolidated Independent School District)

References

Census-designated places in Starr County, Texas
Census-designated places in Texas